Crosshill railway station is a railway station serving the Crosshill and Govanhill areas of Glasgow, Scotland. It is located on the Cathcart Circle Line but also has trains going to and from Neilston and Newton. Services are provided by ScotRail on behalf of Strathclyde Partnership for Transport.

History 
The station opened concurrently with the Cathcart District Railway, on 1 March 1886.  It was closed as a wartime economy measure between January 1917 and June 1919.  The 1923 Grouping saw ownership pass to the London, Midland and Scottish Railway and then onto the Scottish Region of British Railways in January 1948.  Many trains over the route began to be worked by diesel multiple units from the summer of 1958, with overhead electrification following in 1962.  A line voltage of 6.25 kV AC was used due initially to clearance issues with the bridges and cuttings along the route, though this was subsequently increased to the standard 25 kV in the early 1970s.

Services

2016 
A Sunday service is almost the same except the Cathcart Circle trains do not operate. As a result, only three trains per hour operate to Glasgow Central.

Routes

References

Notes

Sources 

 
 
 
 

Railway stations in Glasgow
Former Caledonian Railway stations
Railway stations in Great Britain opened in 1886
Railway stations in Great Britain closed in 1917
Railway stations in Great Britain opened in 1919
SPT railway stations
Railway stations served by ScotRail
Govanhill and Crosshill